The Adachi clan (安達氏) is a family of samurai who are said to have been descended from Fujiwara no Yamakage. Their historical significance derives from their successes during the Genpei War and their subsequent affiliation with the Hōjō clan.

Important figures of the clan are:
 Adachi Kagemori
 Adachi Morinaga

Genealogy
Bold names denote the head of family. Solid lines denote direct relations. The superscript numbers show the line of succession. The organization is in birth order.

External links